is a microgenre of pop music or a general aesthetic that flourished in Japan in the mid-to late 1990s.  The music genre is distinguished by a "cut-and-paste" approach that was inspired by the kitsch, fusion, and artifice from certain music styles of the past. The most common reference points were 1960s culture and Western pop music, especially the work of Burt Bacharach, Brian Wilson, Phil Spector, and Serge Gainsbourg.

Shibuya-kei first emerged as retail music from the Shibuya district of Tokyo. Flipper's Guitar, a duo led by Kenji Ozawa and Keigo Oyamada (Cornelius), formed the bedrock of the genre and influenced all of its groups, but the most prominent Shibuya-kei band was Pizzicato Five, who fused mainstream J-pop with a mix of jazz, soul, and lounge influences. Shibuya-kei peaked in the late 1990s and declined after its principal players began moving into other music styles.

Overseas, fans of Shibuya-kei were typically indie pop enthusiasts, which contrasted with the tendency for other Japanese music scenes to attract listeners of foreign anime fandoms. This was partly because many Shibuya-kei records had been distributed in the United States through major indie labels like Matador and Grand Royal.

Background and influences 

In the late 1980s, the term "J-pop" was formulated by FM radio station J-Wave as a way to distinguish Western-sounding Japanese music (a central characteristic of Shibuya-kei) from exclusively Euro-American music. In 1991, HMV Shibuya opened a J-pop corner which showcased displays and leaflets that highlighted indie records. It was one of those displays that coined the moniker "Shibuya-kei".

At the time, Shibuya was an epicenter for Tokyo fashion, nightlife, and youth culture with a cluster of record shops like Tower Records and HMV, which housed a selection of imports, as well as fashionable record boutiques. British independent record labels such as él Records and the Compact Organization had been influences on the various Japanese indie distributors, and thanks to the late 1980s economic boom in Japan, Shibuya music shops could afford to stock a wider selection of genres.

Musicologist Mori Yoshitaka writes that popular groups from the area responded with their "eclectically fashionable hybrid music influenced by different musical resources from around the world in a way that might be identified as postmodernist ... they were able to listen to, quote, sample, mix, and dub this music, and eventually create a new hybrid music. In other words, Shibuya-kei was a byproduct of consumerism". Journalist W. David Marx notes that the musicians were less interested in having an original sound than they were about having a sound that reflected their personal tastes, that the music "was literally built out of this collection process. The 'creative content' is almost all curation, since they basically reproduced their favourite songs, changing the melody a bit but keeping all parts of the production intact."

Specific touchstones include the French yé-yé music of Serge Gainsbourg, the orchestral pop of Van Dyke Parks and the Beach Boys' Brian Wilson, the lounge pop of Burt Bacharach, and the sunshine pop of Roger Nichols and the Small Circle of Friends. Wilson was romanticized as a mad genius experimenting in the recording studio, and Phil Spector's Wall of Sound was emulated not for its density, but for its elaborate quality. From él Records, Louis Philippe was heralded as the "godfather" of the Shibuya sound around the time he released the Japan-only albums Jean Renoir (1992) and Rainfall (1993). Reynolds adds that Postcard Records and "the tradition of Scottish indie pop it spawned was hugely admired, and there was a penchant for what the Japanese dubbed 'funk-a-latina': Haircut 100 ..., Blue Rondo à la Turk, Matt Bianco. The composite of all these innocuous and already distinctly ersatz sources was a cosmopolitan hybrid that didn’t draw on any indigenous Japanese influences."

Development and popularity

Flipper's Guitar, a duo led by Kenji Ozawa and Keigo Oyamada (also known as Cornelius), formed the bedrock of Shibuya-kei and influenced all of its groups. However, the term was not coined until after the fact, and its exact definition would not be crystallized until 1993. Many of these artists indulged in a cut-and-paste style that was inspired by previous genres based on kitsch, fusion, and artifice. In the West, the development of chamber pop and a renewed interest in cocktail music was a remote parallel. According to Reynolds: "What was really international was the underlying sensibility. ... The Shibuya-kei approach was common to an emerging class of rootless cosmopolitans with outposts in most major cities of the world ... known pejoratively as hipsters." Eventually, the music of Shibuya-kei groups and their derivatives could be heard in virtually every cafe and boutique in Japan. Reynolds references this as an issue with its "model of elevated consumerism and curation-as-creation ... Once music is a reflection of esoteric knowledge rather than expressive urgency, its value is easily voided."

After Oyamada went solo, he became one of the biggest Shibuya-kei successes. Although his debut "The Sun Is My Enemy" only peaked at No. 15 on Japanese singles charts, writer Ian Martin calls it a "key track" that helped define Shibuya-kei.  His 1997 album Fantasma is also considered one of the greatest achievements of the genre. Oyamada landed praise from American music critics, who called him a "modern-day Brian Wilson" or the "Japanese Beck". Marx described the album as "an important textbook for an alternative musical history where Bach, Bacharach, and the Beach Boys stands as the great triumvirate."

The most prominent Shibuya-kei band was Pizzicato Five, who fused mainstream J-pop with a mix of jazz, soul, and lounge influences, reaching a commercial peak with Made in USA (1994). As the style's popularity increased at end of the 1990s, the term began to be applied to many bands whose musical stylings reflected a more mainstream sensibility. Although some artists rejected or resisted being categorized as "Shibuya-kei," the name ultimately stuck, as the style was favored by local businesses, including Shibuya Center Street's HMV Shibuya, which sold Shibuya-kei records in its traditional Japanese music section. Increasingly, musicians outside Japan—including Momus, La Casa Azul, Dimitri from Paris, Ursula 1000, Nicola Conte, Natural Calamity, and Phofo—are labeled Shibuya-kei. South Korean bands such as Clazziquai Project, Casker, and Humming Urban Stereo have been said to represent "a Korean neo-Shibuya-kei movement".

Shibuya-kei's prominence declined after its principal players began moving into other music styles. Momus said in a 2015 interview that the subculture had more to do with the area itself, which he called "an overblown shopping district".

See also

Art pop
Remix culture

Notes

References

Works cited

External links
Keikaku - Independent and little known Japanese Artist profiles, reviews, interviews and articles in English.
Shibuya-kei on CDJournal.com 

 
Music in Tokyo
Japanese styles of music
Music scenes
Pop music genres
J-pop
Retro style
1990s in Japanese music